Patience Masua (born 7 January 1999) is a Namibian politician and lawyer. She serves as a Member of Parliament in the National Assembly, after being appointed by President Hage Geingob in April, 2021, becoming Namibia's youngest Member of Parliament. Previously, she was Secretary General of Namibia National Students Organization and served in the UNAM SRC as student parliamentary speaker.

Early life
Masua was born in Gobabis, Omaheke, on 7 January 1999 after which her family moved to Windhoek. She attended pre and primary school at Kleine Professor College. However, she finished primary school at Suiderhof Primary School and proceeded to complete her high school at Delta Secondary School Windhoek where she served as Deputy Head Girl in the Learners Representative Council.

Student politics and activism
Patience entered mainstream student politics and activism in university, primarily through her newspaper opinion pieces and then serving in the student union as Faculty Representative for the University of Namibia Faculty of Law. Later she ran for the position of Speaker of Student Parliament of the UNAM SRC and won it in 2019. Thereafter she served as Secretary-General for the Namibia National Students Organisation (NANSO). In 2022, Masua inspired women leaders at Women Leaders Expo in Dubai. She shared her story as a politician and lawyer, fighting for equality and justice in Namibia.

Community Work 
In 2021, Masua founded the Patience Masua Foundation Africa (PMF Africa). PMF Africa was established with the mission to empower young Namibians in the areas of education, entrepreneurial development, capacity-building and research.

References

1999 births
Living people
Members of the National Assembly (Namibia)
Women members of the National Assembly (Namibia)